FBC Latgale is a Men's 1st Floorball League of Latvia team based in Daugavpils, Latvia

Goaltenders
  1  Atis Žilvinskis
31  Arturs Keniņš
98  Deniss Višņakovs

Defencemen
  7  Vladislavs Tipans
10  Andrejs Grigorjevs
11  Sergejs Aleksandrovs
15  Sergejs Prokofjevs
16  Jānis Kārkliņš
18  Artūrs Šķinčs
21  Raitis Daugelis
93  Ēriks Čate

Forwards
  5  Nauris Poikans
13  Maksims Krilovs
17  Elviss Millers
20  Elmars Kukjans
23  Sergejs Špeļkovs
33  Aleksandrs Grehovs
81  Janis Jonans
88  Maksims Terehovs
91  Ivans Kokins (C)
99  Igors Kalnačs

References
 Latvian Floorball Union homepage

Sport in Daugavpils
Floorball in Latvia
Latvian floorball teams